Quiet Resolve (1995–2007) was a Canadian Thoroughbred racehorse foaled in Ontario who was voted the 2000 Canadian Horse of the Year. 
A turf specialist, the son of U.S. Triple Crown Champion Affirmed set a new track record for 8.5 furlongs at Keeneland Race Course. In his 2000 Champion season, Quiet Resolve won races in Canada and the United States  and ran second to Kalanisi in the 2000 Breeders' Cup Turf at Churchill Downs.

Quiet resolve was retired in October 2002 following a training injury. He had to be  euthanized on February 1, 2007, after colic surgery at the Ontario Veterinary College hospital at the University of Guelph. He was buried at Sam-Son Farm near Milton, Ontario. In 2017, Quiet Resolve was posthumously inducted into the Canadian Horse Racing Hall of Fame.

Pedigree

External links
 Quiet Resolve's pedigree and partial racing stats

References

 February 6, 2007 Thoroughbred Times article titled Canadian Horse of the Year Quiet Resolve dies after colic surgery

1995 racehorse births
2007 racehorse deaths
Canadian Horse Racing Hall of Fame inductees
Canadian Thoroughbred Horse of the Year
Racehorses bred in Canada
Racehorses trained in Canada
Horse racing track record setters
Sovereign Award winners
Thoroughbred family 2-h